John Arkwright (3 December 1902 – 20 January 1990), also known by the nickname of "Big Jack", was an English professional rugby league footballer who played in the 1920s, 1930s and 1940s.

Playing career

International honours
Jack Arkwright, won caps for England while at St Helens in 1933 against Other Nationalities, while at Warrington in 1936 against France, and Wales, in 1937 against France, in 1938 against France, and won caps for Great Britain while at Warrington in 1936 against Australia (2 matches), and New Zealand, and in 1937 against Australia (3 matches). During the 1936 tour Arkwright achieved the unusual distinction of being dismissed twice in one game.  Playing against Northern Districts he was dismissed for violent play. The opposing captain, J Kingston, appealed to the referee for Arkwright to continue to play.  The referee rescinded the sending off but towards the end of the game dismissed Arkwright again for punching an opponent.

County honours
Jack Arkwright played left-, i.e. number 10, in Lancashire's 7-5 victory over Australia in the 1937–38 Kangaroo tour of Great Britain and France match at Wilderspool Stadium, Warrington on Wednesday 29 September 1937, in front of a crowd of 16,250.

Championship final appearances
Jack Arkwright played left-, i.e. number 11, in St. Helens' 9-5 victory over Huddersfield in the Championship Final during the 1931–32 season at Belle Vue, Wakefield on Saturday 7 May 1932.

County Cup Final appearances
Jack Arkwright played left-, i.e. number 11, in St. Helens' 9-10 defeat by Warrington in the 1932 Lancashire County Cup Final during the 1932–33 season at Central Park, Wigan on Saturday 19 November 1932.

Club career
Jack Arkwright signed for St. Helens for a signing-on fee of £50, he was transferred from St. Helens to Warrington for a world record transfer fee for a forward of £800 on 1 October 1934, (based on increases in average earnings, this would be approximately £146,100 in 2016).

Honoured at St Helens RFC and Warrington RLFC
Jack Arkwright is an inductee in both the St Helens RFC Hall of Fame, and the Warrington RLFC Hall of Fame.

Genealogical information
Jack Arkwright was the father of the rugby league  who played in the 1960s for St. Helens; John Arkwright Jr., and the grandfather of the rugby league footballer; Chris Arkwright.

References

External links
Profile at saints.org.uk
(archived by web.archive.org) Hall of Fame at Wire2Wolves.com
Statistics at wolvesplayers.thisiswarrington.co.uk

1902 births
1990 deaths
England national rugby league team players
English rugby league players
Great Britain national rugby league team players
Lancashire rugby league team players
Rugby league players from St Helens, Merseyside
Rugby league props
Rugby league second-rows
St Helens R.F.C. players
Warrington Wolves players